Griphophanes is a genus of flies in the family Dolichopodidae. It is known from Southeast Asia and the Democratic Republic of the Congo in Central Africa.

Species

Griphophanes cameroonensis Grichanov, 2022
Griphophanes chaetifemoratus Naglis & Grootaert, 2012
Griphophanes congoensis Grichanov, 2010
Griphophanes conversus Naglis & Grootaert, 2012
Griphophanes furcatulus Grootaert & Meuffels, 2012
Griphophanes furcatus Grootaert & Meuffels, 2012
Griphophanes garambaensis Grichanov, 2010
Griphophanes gigantus Naglis & Grootaert, 2012
Griphophanes gravicaudatus (Grootaert & Meuffels, 1997)
Griphophanes longicornis Naglis & Grootaert, 2012
Griphophanes magnus Naglis & Grootaert, 2012
Griphophanes minimus Naglis & Grootaert, 2012
Griphophanes minutulus Naglis & Grootaert, 2012
Griphophanes obscurus Grootaert & Meuffels, 2012
Griphophanes seriatus Naglis & Grootaert, 2012
Griphophanes simplex Naglis & Grootaert, 2012
Griphophanes spinosus Naglis & Grootaert, 2012
Griphophanes tiomanensis Grootaert & Meuffels, 2012

References

Dolichopodidae genera
Peloropeodinae
Diptera of Asia
Diptera of Africa